James Inskipp (1790 – 15 March 1868) started successfully painting when he retired. He exhibited in London and illustrated a version of the Compleat Angler.

Life
Inskipp was born in 1790 and does not come to notice until he retires from the commissariat service when he was about 30 years old. He started to paint and successfully exhibited at the Royal Academy, the British Institution and the Society of British Artists.

Between 1833 and 1836 Sir Nicholas Harris Nicolas published an edition of the Compleat Angler by Isaac Walton which was illustrated by Inskipp. This book contained a portrait of Walton

Death and legacy
Inskipp died at his home at Cattshall Lane in Godalming in 1868. Inskipp has paintings at Cyfarthfa Castle's Museum & Art Gallery and in the British Government Art Collection.

External links
An engraving by James Stewart of Inskipp's painting,  in The Amulet annual for 1831 with illustrative verse by Letitia Elizabeth Landon.

References

1790 births
1868 deaths
19th-century English painters
English male painters
19th-century English male artists